"Everybody Get Up" is the first single of rapper Pitbull's 2005 remix album Money Is Still a Major Issue featuring the R&B group Pretty Ricky. It was released on November 15, 2005.

Music video
This music video was directed by Dr. Teeth.

Track listing
"Everybody Get Up" (album version) – 4:48

References 

2005 singles
2005 songs
Pitbull (rapper) songs
Pretty Ricky songs
TVT Records singles
Song recordings produced by Jim Jonsin
Song recordings produced by Lil Jon
Songs written by Pitbull (rapper)
Songs written by Jim Jonsin